Lipshutz is a surname. It is a variant of Lifshitz. Notable people with the surname include:

Bruce H. Lipshutz (born 1951), American chemist
Robert Lipshutz (1921–2010), American lawyer

See also
Lipschutz